The Central Vanuatu languages form a linkage of Southern Oceanic languages spoken in central Vanuatu.

Languages

Clark (2009)
Clark (2009) provides the following classification of the Central Vanuatu languages, divided into geographic areas. Outlier (aberrant) languages identified by Clark (2009) are in italics. Clark's Central Vanuatu branch is wider in scope, including not only the Shepherd–Efate languages, but also the Malakula and Ambrym–Paama–Epi languages.

Central Vanuatu
Malakula languages
Northeast Malakula (Uripiv), Vao, Vovo; Mpotovoro
Dirak, Malua Bay
V’ënen Taut, Tape
Larevat, Neve’ei, Naman
Navava, Nevwervwer
Unua-Pangkumu
Banam Bay, Aulua
Lendamboi; Nasarian
Axamb, Avok, Maskelynes, Port Sandwich
Sinesip, Naha’ai; Ninde
Ambrym–Paama–Epi area
Ambrym Island: North Ambrym, West Ambrym, South Ambrym
Paama Island: Southeast Ambrym, Paamese
Epi Island: Lewo, Lamen, Bierebo, Baki
Epi Island: Mkir, Bieria
Shepherd–Efate area
Shepherd Islands: Nakanamanga (Nguna); Namakir
Efate Island: South Efate

François (2015)
The following list of 19 Central Vanuatu languages (excluding the Malakula languages) is from François (2015:18-21).

Additionally, the extinct Sowa language was formerly spoken in central Vanuatu.

References  

 .

 
Southern Oceanic languages
Languages of Vanuatu